Clark Colony is a census-designated place (CDP) and Hutterite colony in Spink County, South Dakota, United States. It was first listed as a CDP prior to the 2020 census. The population of the CDP was 92 at the 2020 census.

It is in the southeast part of the county, bordered to the east by the Clark County line.

Demographics

References 

Census-designated places in Spink County, South Dakota
Census-designated places in South Dakota
Hutterite communities in the United States